Pipe and Lyde is a village and civil parish in Herefordshire, England.  The parish includes the village  of Pipe and Lyde and the hamlets of Lower Lyde and Upper Lyde. The population of the civil parish as taken at the 2011 census was 344. Parts of the church of St Peter date from the 13th century including the south doorway which includes Transitional moulding. James Honeyman-Scott (1956-1982), the Pretenders guitarist, is buried in the churchyard.

References

External links

 Pipe and Lyde Parish Council

Villages in Herefordshire